Rheem may refer to:
Rheem Manufacturing Company
Rheem, California (disambiguation), places in California
Rheem Creek
Rheem Classic